Ifil is a surname. Notable people with the surname include:
 Gwen Ifill (1955–2016), American journalist, television newscaster, and author
 Jerel Ifil (born 1982), English footballer
 Philip Ifil (born 1986), English footballer

It may also refer to:
 Ifil, a local name on Guam for Intsia bijuga

See also
 Ifill